Nintendo Software Technology Corporation, doing business as Nintendo Software Technology (NST), is an American video game developer. NST was created by Nintendo as a first-party developer to create games for the North American market, though their games have also been released worldwide. The company was founded by Minoru Arakawa and Claude Comair in 1998 and is located inside of Nintendo of America's headquarters in Redmond, Washington.

History 

The establishment took place in 1998 through a collaboration with the private university DigiPen Institute of Technology, also located in Redmond. The offices opened with several doctorate level instructors and some recent graduates of the university working with several Nintendo of America designers and producers. Their first game, Bionic Commando: Elite Forces, was released for the Game Boy Color in 1999 and was a sequel of Capcom's Bionic Commando.

Over the years, NST has developed many games for Nintendo consoles such as the Mario vs. Donkey Kong series, Wave Race: Blue Storm, and Metroid Prime Hunters.

NST started developing Project H.A.M.M.E.R. For the Nintendo Wii but several problems landed the project in 'development hell'. A large amount of funding was spent on cut-scenes early in development and so when the project started to fall behind managers didn't want to end it because of the capital already spent. The American developers suggested that the problem was the gameplay however the Japanese managers believed the problems were the environments. This dispute, among others, made the project drag on for a number of years before it was totally abandoned and a large number of staff were made redundant.

DigiPen's Main Campus was based in the same building as theirs until 2010.

List of software developed

List of applications developed

Cancelled games

References

External links 
 A group interview with NST about 1080º Avalanche
 Two-part interview with Shigeki Yamashiro, producer of 1080º Avalanche, and Vivek Melwani, lead game designer and director

American companies established in 1998
Nintendo divisions and subsidiaries
First-party video game developers
Video game companies of the United States
Video game development companies
Companies based in Redmond, Washington
Video game companies established in 1998
1998 establishments in Washington (state)
American subsidiaries of foreign companies